Meinecke is a German surname. It may refer to:

People
Emil Meinecke (1892–1975), German flying ace during World War I
Friedrich Meinecke (1862–1954), German historian
Friedrich Meinecke (sculptor) (1878–1913)
Tore Meinecke (born 1967), German tennis player
Tristan Meinecke (1916-2004), American artist

Other
Flugstaffel Meinecke, German television action series